Joseph Harp Correctional Center (JHCC) is an Oklahoma Department of Corrections state prison for male inmates located in Lexington, Cleveland County, Oklahoma. The medium-security facility opened in September 1978 and with a capacity of 1045 inmates is the largest medium-security prison in the state.

JHCC was named for Joseph Harp. who served as warden of the Oklahoma State Reformatory from 1949 to 1969. Regarded by his colleagues as an innovative leader and professional in the field of corrections, he recognized that a high school education was one of the greatest needs that many inmates had lacked which could prevent them from gaining legal employment and often times led to a life of crime. Under Harp's leadership, Oklahoma State Reformatory was one of the first correctional institutions to establish a fully-accredited high school inside prison walls.

According to JHCC, 84 percent of its inmates are incarcerated for committing a violent crime, and ten percent have committed first-degree murder. Inmates typically work in the Oklahoma Correctional Industries program, manufacturing furniture or performing data entry to convert old paper records to  digital documents.

The center offers adult education programs and encourages inmates to earn a GED while serving their sentences. Offenders sentenced as youths for short periods typically arrive under the delayed sentence program. If the youth does well, he may qualify for release with a suspended sentence, if he does not do well, he will be formally sentenced.

References

Prisons in Oklahoma
Buildings and structures in Cleveland County, Oklahoma
1978 establishments in Oklahoma